Jean Taillandier (born 22 January 1938) is a French former football goalkeeper. He played for France in the Euro 1960.

References

 Profile
 Profile

1938 births
Living people
French footballers
France international footballers
Association football goalkeepers
Ligue 1 players
Racing Club de France Football players
RC Lens players
1960 European Nations' Cup players